Rosângela de Souza Gomes (born 27 December 1966) more commonly known as Rosângela Gomes is a Brazilian politician. She has spent her political career representing Rio de Janeiro, having served as state representative since 2015.

Personal life
She is the daughter of Althair Costa Souza and Sulamite Souza. Gomes is a member of the Igreja Universal do Reino de Deus, and the endorsement by the church's leader Edir Macedo played a big role in her getting elected to the federal chamber of deputies in the 2014 election.

Political career
Before being elected to the federal chamber of deputies, Gomes served as a vereador in her hometown of Nova Iguaçu for a decade, as well as serving in the state legislature from 2011 to 2014.

In the aftermath of the 2014 election, Gomes and three other members of the IURD and two politicians from the Assembleias de Deus church were accused by the prosecutors of Rio de Janeiro of violating Brazil's campaign laws by campaigning in places of worship. If convicted the five politicians would have been suspended for 8 years, but the charges were dropped.

Gomes voted in favor of the impeachment of then-president Dilma Rousseff. Gomes voted in favor of the 2017 Brazilian labor reform, and would vote against a corruption investigation into Rousseff's successor Michel Temer.

References

1966 births
Living people
Brazilian educators
Liberal Party (Brazil, 1985) politicians
Republicans (Brazil) politicians
Brazilian Pentecostals
Members of the Universal Church of the Kingdom of God
Members of the Chamber of Deputies (Brazil) from Rio de Janeiro (state)
Members of the Legislative Assembly of Rio de Janeiro
People from Nova Iguaçu
Brazilian politicians of African descent
Brazilian women in politics